Craspedocephalus is a genus of venomous pit vipers found in Asia from the Indian Subcontinent to Southeast Asia. Currently 14 species are recognized.

Description
Most species in the genus Craspedocephalus are relatively small, primarily arboreal species, with thin bodies and prehensile tails. Most Craspedocephalus species are typically green in color, but some species also have yellow, black, orange, red, or gold markings.

Feeding
The diet of Craspedocephalus species includes a variety of animals, including lizards, amphibians, birds, rodents, and other small mammals.

Species

*) Not including the nominate subspecies.

See Also
 Trimeresurus

References

External links

Craspedocephalus
Snake genera
Taxa named by Heinrich Kuhl
Taxa named by Johan Conrad van Hasselt